La familia Miau is a Mexican telenovela produced by Televisa for Telesistema Mexicano in 1963.

Cast 
Eduardo Fajardo
Alejandro Ciangherotti
Polo Ortín
Nora Veryán
Elodia Hernández
Andrea Palma
Magda Guzmán
Armando Arriola
Alberto Galán
María Eugenia Ríos
Óscar Morelli
Enrique Díaz 'Indiano'
Carlos Méndez
Ángel Méndez

References

External links 

Mexican telenovelas
1963 telenovelas
Televisa telenovelas
1963 Mexican television series debuts
1963 Mexican television series endings
Spanish-language telenovelas